Moskvin (masculine, Russian: Москвин) or Moskvina (feminine) is a Russian surname, derived from the word Москва (Moskva, meaning Moscow). It is also a toponym that may refer to

Surname
 Anatoly Moskvin (1968), Russian academic and linguist
Artyom Moskvin (born 1988), Russian football goalkeeper
 Igor Moskvin (1929–2020), Russian/Soviet figure skating coach
 Ivan Moskvin (1874–1946), Russian actor
Kseniya Moskvina (born 1989), Russian swimmer
 Mikhail Trilisser (also known as Mikhail Aleksandrovich Moskvin; 1883–1940), Soviet secret police officer
Nataliia Moskvina (born 1988), Ukrainian trampoline gymnast
 Stanislav Moskvin (born 1939), Soviet Olympic cyclist
 Tamara Moskvina (born 1941), Russian/Soviet figure skating coach
Tatiana Moskvina (born 1973), Russian-born Belarusian judoka
 Tatyana Moskvina (1958), Russian columnist, novelist, actress, radio and TV journalist and host, leading theater and film critic.

Places in Russia
Moskvin Pochinok, a village in Vologda
Moskvina, Chelyabinsk Oblast, a village in Chelyabinsk Oblast

Russian-language surnames
Toponymic surnames